Ze'ev Herring (1910 – 26 February 1988) was an Israeli politician who served as a member of the Knesset for the Alignment between 1969 and 1974.

Biography
Born in Przemyśl in Austria-Hungary (today in Poland), Herring studied law at the University of Warsaw, and later at the London School of Economics. He became active in Jewish student organisations, and joined the Zionist Socialist Workers Party. In 1935 he became secretary general of the party in eastern Galicia, and edited its Yiddish language weekly newspaper.

In 1940 he made aliyah to Mandatory Palestine, where he settled in kibbutz Ramat David. In the same year volunteered for the British Army. He served in the Jewish Brigade, and following the end of the war, helped Holocaust survivors make aliyah to Palestine, serving as secretary of the Jewish Brigade's diaspora centre secretary between 1946 and 1947.

In 1954 he became a member of the Histadrut's executive committee, and was a member of its planning committee between 1954 and 1969. He also later chaired its department for external relations. In 1956 he started lecturing in the political science department at Tel Aviv University, where he worked until 1960.

In 1969 he was elected to the Knesset on the Alignment list, but lost his seat in the 1973 elections.

He died in 1988.

References

External links

1910 births
1988 deaths
Jews from Galicia (Eastern Europe)
People from Przemyśl
University of Warsaw alumni
Alumni of the London School of Economics
Polish politicians
Polish emigrants to Mandatory Palestine
Ashkenazi Jews in Mandatory Palestine
Israeli trade unionists
Jewish Brigade personnel
Academic staff of Tel Aviv University
Alignment (Israel) politicians
Zionist Socialist Workers Party politicians
Members of the 7th Knesset (1969–1974)
Histadrut
Polish editors
Burials at Nahalat Yitzhak Cemetery